Bang Attack is a video game for WiiWare developed by Netherlands-based Engine Software. It was originally released in Europe on December 5,  and later in North America on April 19, 2010.  The game was originally released under the name Bang!, with the name later changed to Bang Attack to avoid a naming conflict with the existing card game Bang!.

Gameplay
Engine Software describes the game as a casual puzzle game, and involves players clicking on groupings of three or more of the same kind of objects (such as fruit or seashells) with the Wii Remote in order to make them disappear and score points. The game also features a two-player battle mode.

References

Puzzle video games
2008 video games
Video games developed in the Netherlands
Wii-only games
WiiWare games
Wii games
Engine Software games